Ranger was launched in Liverpool in 1789. She made four complete voyages as a slave ship in the triangular trade in enslaved people. A French privateer captured her in 1796 during her fifth slave voyage, but she was recaptured some months later. Thereafter she disappears from online records.

Career
Ranger first appeared in Lloyd's Register (LR) in 1789.

1st slave voyage (1789–1790): Captain John Corran sailed from Liverpool on 4 November 1789. Ranger started acquiring slaves on 3 March 1790, first at Cape Coast Castle, and then at Anomabu. She sailed from Africa on 26 June and arrived at Kingston, Jamaica on 28 August 1790. She had embarked 180 slaves and she arrived with 179. On 25 September she sailed from Jamaica and arrived back at Liverpool on 25 November. She had left with 25 crew members and suffered no crew deaths on her voyage.

2nd slave voyage (1791): Captain John Corran sailed from Liverpool on 20 February 1791 and began acquiring slaves on 6 May. She acquired her slaves at Bonny and left Africa on 24 June. She arrived at Kingston on 18 August. She had embarked 190 slaves and arrived with 170, for an 11% mortality rate. She sailed from Kingston on 16 September and arrived back  at Liverpool on 17 November. She had left Liverpool with 22 crew members and had suffered four crew deaths on her voyage.

3rd slave voyage (1792–1793): Captain Corran sailed from Liverpool on 16 April 1792. Ranger gathered slaves at Whydah. She sailed from Africa on 29 September and arrived at St Vincent in November with 169 slaves. She arrived back at Liverpool on 6 February 1793. At some point Captain Ladwick Carlile replaced Corran, but it is not clear when. Ranger had left Liverpool with 19 crew members and she had suffered two crew deaths on her voyage.

4th slave voyage (1793–1794): By the time Ranger left on her fourth slave voyage, war with France had broken out. Captain John Gardner acquired a letter of marque 2 September. However, apparently it was Captain Caleb Gardner that sailed from Liverpool on 13 September. Ranger began gathering slaves on 30 November, somewhere in West Africa. She sailed from Africa on 11 March 1794 and arrived at Kingston on 24 May. She had embarked 183 slaves and she had arrived with 181, for a 1% mortality rate. She sailed from Jamaica on 23 July and arrived back at Liverpool on 7 October.

5th slave voyage (1795–1796): Captain John Wilson sailed from Liverpool on 17 January 1795. she was reported to have arrived at Angola. In February 1796, Lloyd's List reported that Ranger, Wilson, master, was the windward of Barbados, having come from Africa, when she encountered a privateer. After an action of two hours, the privateer captured Ranger. In May Lloyd's List reported that Ranger, Wilson, master, had been retaken and brought into Barbados.

Citations

1789 ships
Liverpool slave ships
Captured ships